Deux Frères (literally Two Brothers) was an 80-gun ship of the line of the French Navy.

She was funded by a don des vaisseaux donation from the two brothers of King Louis XVI. The ship was laid down at Brest in July 1782, and launched on 17 September 1784, based on a design by Antoine Groignard, and built by Jacques-Augustin Lamothe. On 29 September 1792, she was renamed Juste.

 captured Juste at the battle of the Glorious First of June in 1794. Captain William Cayley commissioned her  in the Royal Navy as HMS Juste in August 1795.  In October Captain the Honourable Thomas Pakenham replaced Cayley and commissioned Juste for service in the Channel. Captain Sir Henry Trollope replaced Pakenham in June 1799. In 1801 she was commanded by Captains Herbert Sawyer, Richard Dacres — under whom she took part in Rear-Admiral Robert Calder's pursuit of Honoré Ganteaume's fleet to the West Indies — and Sir Edmund Nagle.

Fate
In April 1802 Juste was laid up in ordinary at Plymouth, and was broken up there in February 1811.

See also
 List of ships captured in the 18th century

References

 

Ships of the line of the French Navy
1784 ships
Captured ships
Don des vaisseaux